The Ukrainian American Archives and Museum of Detroit, founded 1958, is a museum focused on Ukrainian immigration to the Detroit area, and Ukrainian culture, art, and contributions to the United States.  The collections include Ukrainian art, crafts, musical instruments, textiles and photographs.  The archive holdings relate to Ukrainian immigration and the library contains 20,000 books.  Classes are given in English as a second language and Ukrainian folk arts and embroidery.

The museum is located at 11756 Charest St., Hamtramck, Michigan.

References

External links
 Ukrainian American Archives and Museum of Detroit Official site
 Find the latest Ukrainian-American news

Museums established in 1958
Ukrainian-American culture in Michigan
Ethnic museums in Michigan
Museums in Wayne County, Michigan
Archives in the United States
Ukrainian museums in the United States
Hamtramck, Michigan
1958 establishments in Michigan